Peter Machin may refer to:

 Peter Machin (footballer) (1883–?), English footballer
 Peter Machin (darts player) (born 1973), Australian darts player